Xoraxane Roma in Balkan Romani language, are non-Vlax Romani people, who adopted Sunni Islam of Hanafi madhab at the time of the Ottoman Empire. Some of them are Derviş of Sufism belief, and the biggest Tariqa of Jerrahi is located at the largest Arlije and Gurbeti Muslim Roma settlement in Europe in Šuto Orizari, locally called Shutka in North Macedonia have their own Romani Imamand the Muslim Roma in Šuto Orizari use the Quran in Balkan Romani language. Many Romanlar in Turkey, are members of the Hindiler Tekkesi a Qadiriyya-Tariqa, founded in 1738 by the Indian Muslim Sheykh Seyfullah Efendi El Hindi in Selamsız.

Muslim Roma practice religious male circumcision-Ceremony (Bijav Suneti) with great pomp and festivities,  the boys are mostly circumcised at the age of five, because the number 5 (panč) is a sacred symbol among the Romani people. It is a custom among Muslim Roma that the foreskin must be buried. They believe the foreskin will come back to Men in Paradise (Jannah), based on a Hadith from Sahih al-Bukhari 6524: The Prophet (Sallallahu Alaihi wa Sallam) said: "You will be raised on the Day of Judgement barefooted, naked, and uncircumicized (with foreskin)", burying the foreskin is also a Tradition by South Asian Muslims. During the ceremony, the childs hand and feet is held by his Kirvo (godfather). A Kirvo pays the cost of the circumcision ceremony. The Tradition of a Kirve who is similar to a Sandek, is also practised in Alevism and Yazidism in Turkey. Islam among Roma is historically associated with life of Roma within the Ottoman Empire, because Muslim Roma were preferred in the Ottoman Empire and was settled in the Balkans and Rumelia, taken from Anatolia Eyalet and Egypt Eyalet. But Muslim Roma paid also a Jizya in the first centurys of the Ottoman Empire, an exception were the Muslim Roma in Ottoman Bosnia and Herzegovina, who were exempt from taxes by the order of Selim II. After the Edict of Gülhane all Muslim Roma were freed to paid the Taxation in the Ottoman Empire and became fully accepted Muslims. The Turkish Historian Reşat Ekrem Koçu, explained that a Group of Lom people who lived in Istanbul convert closed to Islam in the 19th century. Correspondingly, significant cultural minorities of Muslim Roma are found in Turkey, Bosnia and Herzegovina, Albania, Montenegro, Kosovo, Republic of North Macedonia, Bulgaria, (by mid-1990s estimates, Muslim Roma in constituted about 40% of Roma in Bulgaria.), (a very small group of Muslim Roma exists in the Dobruja and Wallachia region of Romania, comprising 1% of the country's Muslim Romani population), Croatia (45% of the country's Romani population, who came from Bosnia), Southern Russia, Greece (a small part of Muslim Roma concentrated in Western Thrace), Northern Cyprus, Southern Serbia (geographical region) and Crimea. The majority of Muslim Roma in the former Yugoslavia speak Balkan Romani and South Slavic languages, while many speak only the language from the host country's like the Albanized Muslim Roma Groups from Albania, Kosovo, Montenegro and North Macedonia, speak only the Albanian language and be called Khorakhan Shiptari, they are fully adopted the Albanian culture, other created an own identity like Ashkali and Balkan Egyptians, and some deny there Romani Background, especially in Kosovo and claimed to be Albanians or Turks. Turkish language is used by the Turkish Roma, only a view speak Kurbetcha , Rumelian Romani or Sepečides Romani. Some Muslim Roma also used the word Gypsy for themselves because they did not perceive it as a derogatory term. Muslim Roma culture is based on the Islamic culture. Under Ottoman Rule, the Christian and Muslim Roma were separated, by the order of Suleiman the Magnificent. Muslim Roma were forbidden to marry Christian Roma and live together or to made business. Muslim Roma Men served in the Military of the Ottoman Empire, especially in the Ottoman military band Significant differences between the Muslim and Christian Roma emerged through the centuries. Orthodox Christian Vlax Romani see themself as the čáče Roma (true Roma) and do not consider Muslim Roma to be part of the Romani society and call them Turks and explain they "slice the foreskins from their members". The Muslim Roma, however, see the Christian Roma as foreign and call them Dasikane (Servant, slaves). Also the phrase Amare Roma (Our Roma) and Cudza Roma (foreign Roma) is used vice versa. There is a huge cultural gap between the two religious groups.

Genetic
Xoraxane Roma are of very mixed Ancestry. While the Early Romani people traces back to the Indian Subcontinent, especially from Rohri in the Sukkur District of Sindh also Gene flow from the Ottoman Turks spilled over and established a higher frequency of the Y-haplogroups J and E3b in Balkan Roma Groups. The Greek Doctor A. G. Paspati made the statemant in his Book, that Turks married often Roma Woman, as example are the Basketmaker (Sepetçi) Sepečides Romani who is of Turkish/Greeks mixed Ancestry. Greeks and South Slavs DNA influenced also the Balkans Roma.
In Bulgaria, Muslim Roma woman married sometimes with Muslim Men of Non-Romani Background, while Muslim Roma Men intermarried more with Bulgarian then Balkan Turkish Woman. In the other case, Muslim  Turkish Romani Men from Bulgaria who went as Workers to Poland married often Polish Woman.
Another genetic study shows that Balkans Roma are related to the Changar tribe from Pakistan of Punjab 
Also, the genetics of Peoples of the Caucasus influenced the Genetic impact of Balkans Roma people.
Some Xoraxane Roma must have Dom people Ancestry too, because in Evliya Çelebi's Seyahatname of 1668, he explained that the Gypsy's from Komotini (Gümülcine) swear by their heads, their ancestors came from Egypt. Also the sedentary Gypsys groups from Serres region in Greece, believe their ancestors were once taken from Egypt Eyalet by the Ottomans after 1517 to Rumelia, to work on the tobacco plantations of Turkish feudals there. Interestingly, the Ghagar a subgroup of the Doms in Egypt, tell that some of them went in the past to Ottoman Hungary. This statement is supported by the fact that Muslim Gypsys settled in Baranya and the City Pécs at the Ottoman Hungary. After the Siege of Pécs when Habsburg take Hungary, Muslim Roma and other Muslims from Pécs was forced convert to the Catholic fait in the years 1686 -1713, or left the Country. The Muslim Turkish Romani in the Dobruja are of very mixed Ancestry, like former Christian Orthodox Roma who convert to Islam and Muslim Roma who came from the whole Ottoman Empire, intermingled with Turks and other Muslims like Crimean Tatars, Persian, Kurds, Fellachs and Albanians who was settled in Ottoman Dobruja.

Indian Subcontinent: Haplogroup H (Y-DNA).
Western Asia/Middle East: Haplogroup J (Y-DNA) and Haplogroup E (Y-DNA).
Europe: Haplogroup I (Y-DNA).
Central Asia/West Eurasia: Haplogroup R1a and Haplogroup R1b.

While the main Romani Y-Haplogroups are H1a1a (H-M82)J2a2 (M67) and E1b1b1a (E-V68), there are also several other Haplogroups, only a view of Romani Men share the R1a1 Haplogroup, who shows a clear similarity to Indian Brahmin Y-DNA who is R1a1 too. and some share also R1b1 Haplogroup.

Settlings
After the collapse of the Ottoman Empire, the Muslim Roma have found themselves under double discrimination in regions where Islam was a minority religion, experiencing both Antiziganism and anti-Muslim sentiment.

At the Greek War of Independence, Russo-Turkish War (1877–1878) and Balkan Wars (1912–1913), Muslim Roma flee together with other different Muslim Groups to Istanbul and East Thrace, as Muhacir.

At the Population exchange between Greece and Turkey, Muslim Turkish Roma from Greece have also been resettled in Turkey. In Turkish, they are called Mübadil Romanlar.

In 1950–1951 Muslim Turkish Roma from Bulgaria came to Turkey and settled in Çanakkale and surroundings.

From 1953 -1968, Muslim Turkish Roma and Turks from Yugoslavia emigrated to Turkey,

Because of the relative ease of migration in modern times, Muslim Roma may be found in other parts of the world as well. Turkish Roma from Turkey and also other Muslim Roma from ex-Yugoslavia, came to West Europe as Gastarbeiter, but seen by the Host population as Turks or Yugoslavs. Muslim Roma from Bosnia and Kosovo went at the time of the Yugoslav Wars to Italy, and live especially in Florence. Xoraxane (Muslim Roma) from former Yugoslavia went to USA, settled mostly in New York, and South America. Since 2007, Turkish Roma from Bulgaria went as workers to West Europe

Horahane term 
Horahane Roma (also spelled as Khorakhane, Xoraxane, Kharokane,  Xoraxai, etc.)  is a Religionym and confessionym and means Turks (term for Muslims) and are colloquially referred to as, Lovers of the Koran. They are several Groups of Horahane Roma, named after their old traditional professional activities, also divived in sedentary and nomadic groups.

 Dress 
Muslim Roma women wear beautiful silk Dimije also known as Turkish salvar, at weddings, circumcision ceremonies, and other festivals. Even on weekdays, quite a few older women, but also some younger women, wear the şalvar.

 Dance and music 
Belly dance and Romano Hora (dance), Roman Havaları 8/9 tact, Zurna, Davul, Clarinet are performed. In the Ottoman Empire, especially young handsome Romani Guys were taken as Köçek-Dancers while young Romani female-dancers were named Çengi'

See also
Arlije 
Gurbeti
Sepečides Romani
Zargari tribe
Kakava
Turkish Romani

References

Further reading
Roma Muslims in the Balkans by Elena Marushiakova and Vesselin Popov

Romani groups
Romani in Albania
Romani in Bosnia and Herzegovina
Romani in Bulgaria
Romani in Croatia
Romani in Kosovo
Romani in North Macedonia
Romani in Turkey
Romani in Greece
Romani in Cyprus
Romani in Romania
 
Romani religion
Muslims by nationality
Muslim communities in Europe